The 1996 Belgian Cup Final, took place on 26 May 1996 and was a Bruges derby between Club Brugge and Cercle Brugge. It was the 41st Belgian Cup final. Cercle Brugge took the lead through an early goal by Gábor Torma, but two goals by Mario Stanić still in the first half tilted the tie in favour of Club Brugge.

Route to the final

Match

Details

External links
  
 RSSSF Belgium Cups 1995/96

Belgian Cup finals
Cup Final